Bohdan may refer to:

 Bohdan, a Slavic masculine name, a variant spelling of Bogdan (which includes a list of people named Bohdan as well as Bogdan)
 Bohdan, Podlaskie Voivodeship, a village in Poland
 Bohdan (bus), a bus manufactured in Ukraine